The Haworth Public Schools are a community public school district, serving students in kindergarten through eighth grade from Haworth, in Bergen County, New Jersey, United States.

As of the 2019–20 school year, the district, comprised of one school, had an enrollment of 395 students and 40.0 classroom teachers (on an FTE basis), for a student–teacher ratio of 9.9:1.

The district is classified by the New Jersey Department of Education as being in District Factor Group "I," the second-highest of eight groupings. District Factor Groups organize districts statewide to allow comparison by common socioeconomic characteristics of the local districts. From lowest socioeconomic status to highest, the categories are A, B, CD, DE, FG, GH, I and J.

Public school students in ninth through twelfth grades attend Northern Valley Regional High School at Demarest in Demarest, which serves students from Closter, Demarest and Haworth. The high school is part of the Northern Valley Regional High School District, which also serves students from Harrington Park, Northvale, Norwood and Old Tappan at Northern Valley Regional High School at Old Tappan. During the 1994-96 school years, Northern Valley Regional High School at Demarest was awarded the Blue Ribbon School Award of Excellence by the United States Department of Education. As of the 2019–20 school year, the high school had an enrollment of 959 students and 93.4 classroom teachers (on an FTE basis), for a student–teacher ratio of 10.3:1.

The district participates in special education programs offered by Region III, one of seven such regional programs in Bergen County. Region III coordinates and develops special education programs for the 1,000 students with learning disabilities in the region, which also includes the Alpine, Closter, Demarest, Harrington Park, Northvale, Norwood and Old Tappan districts, as well as the Northern Valley Regional High School District.

History

Jennifer Montesano served as the superintendent from 2014 until 2018, when she became superintendent of the Secaucus Public Schools.

School
Haworth Public School serves students in grades K-8. The school had an enrollment of 387 students in grades K-8 as of the 2019–20 school year.
Patricia Voigt, Principal

Administration
Core members of the district's administration are:
Dr. Peter J. Hughes, Superintendent
Paul Wolford, Business Administrator

Board of education
The district's board of education, comprised of seven members, sets policy and oversees the fiscal and educational operation of the district through its administration. As a Type II school district, the board's trustees are elected directly by voters to serve three-year terms of office on a staggered basis, with either two or three seats up for election each year held (since 2012) as part of the November general election. The board appoints a superintendent to oversee the day-to-day operation of the district.

References

External links

Haworth Home & School Association
 
School Data for the Haworth Public School, National Center for Education Statistics
Northern Valley Regional High School District

Haworth, New Jersey
New Jersey District Factor Group I
School districts in Bergen County, New Jersey